Quercus cambodiensis, synonym Quercus auricoma, is an Asian tree species in the family Fagaceae, endemic to Cambodia. It is placed in section Cyclobalanopsis (the ring-cupped oaks).

References 

cambodiensis
Flora of Cambodia